Erma Horsley (born c. 1897) was an American film editor and screenwriter who worked for Republic Pictures during the 1920s and 1930s.

Biography 
Born Erma Dunkell in California, she attended Hollywood High School before marrying Fox producer Arthur Horsley in 1916. She worked as a film editor at the studios and also got a writing credit on 1928's Mystery Valley. She and fellow editor Robert O. Crandall ran their own company, Erro Film Service, in the 1940s.

Selected filmography 
As editor:

 I Cover the War! (1937)
 California Straight Ahead! (1937)
 Conflict (1936)
 Mystery Valley (1928)
 Lightnin' Shot (1928)
 The Devil's Tower (1928)
 The Grey Vulture (1926)

As writer:

 Mystery Valley (1928)

References 

American film editors
American women film editors
Hollywood High School alumni
1890s births
Year of death missing